Coco Gauff and Jessica Pegula  defeated Gabriela Dabrowski and Giuliana Olmos in the final, 1–6, 7–5, [10–4] to win the women's doubles tennis title at the 2022 San Diego Open.

This was the first WTA Tour-level event to be held in the San Diego area since 2013.

Seeds

Draw

Draw

References

External links 
Main draw

San Diego Open